Antonio Lacayo Oyanguren (died November 17, 2015) was a Nicaraguan politician who served as Minister of the Presidency from 1990 to 1996, during the government of Violeta Barrios de Chamorro. He was a central figure in the country’s transition to democracy. He was campaign manager for Chamorro’s 1990 run for the presidency that defeated FSLN incumbent Daniel Ortega. In 1991, he created the Cordoba Oro.

Personal life

He was married to Cristiana Chamorro Barrios.

In 2015, he died in a helicopter crash into the San Juan River. The pilot and two Americans, executives from Coca-Cola and Tampa Juice, also died.

Publications

 La Difícil Transición Nicaraguense en el Gobierno con Doña Violeta (2005)

References

2015 deaths
Nicaraguan politicians
Victims of aviation accidents or incidents in Nicaragua
Victims of helicopter accidents or incidents
Year of birth missing
Place of birth missing
Date of death missing
Chamorro family